The basketball tournament at the 1993 Mediterranean Games was held in Languedoc-Roussillon, France.

Medalists

References
1993 Competition Medalists (Men and Women results)

Basketball
Basketball at the Mediterranean Games
International basketball competitions hosted by France
1992–93 in European basketball
1993 in Asian basketball
1993 in African basketball
1992–93 in French basketball